Exoletuncus consertus is a species of moth of the family Tortricidae. It is found in Ecuador in the provinces of Napo and Pastaza.

The wingspan is 22–24 mm. Adults are similar to Exoletuncus musivus, but the labial palpus is cream grey and the pattern of the forewings is broader.

References

Moths described in 1997
Euliini
Moths of South America
Taxa named by Józef Razowski